Incognito was a Linux distribution based on Gentoo Linux. Its main feature was the inclusion of anonymity and security tools such as Tor by default and being able to be used as a Live CD or Live USB.

Incognito's developer has stated on the project's homepage that Incognito has been discontinued and recommends Tails as an alternative.

Release history

Anonymity and security tools 
 Tor for anonymous internet browsing.
 TrueCrypt, a file/partition encryption utility.
 Enigmail, a security extension for Thunderbird.
 Torbutton, a Firefox plugin to improve Tor's anonymity in Firefox.
 FireGPG, Firefox plugin for using GnuPG for Webmail.
 GnuPG, OpenPGP implementation for encryption.
 KeePassX, a password manager.

Besides these tools, the RAM was overwritten during system shutdown to ensure no possibility of data recovery later.

License 
The Tor project listed Incognito as a licensee of the Tor brand name. In accordance to this license agreement, Incognito had the right to use the Tor name and logo.

References

External links 
 Official Website
 Incognito at Softpedia
 Tails, the successor of Incognito

Gentoo Linux derivatives
Linux distributions